The 7th Regional Community Defense Group, Army Reserve Command; is a line unit of the Army Reserve Command. It was created for the sole purpose of Reserve Force management, procurement, and organisation in the areas encompassing Central Visayas.

Mission
To develop, organize train, equip and administer a highly competent mobilizeable reserve force as an integral component of the total army and in the defense of the region and to participate in socio-economic development effort.

Vision
A capable and responsible mobilizeable Citizen Armed Force as a component of the total army in pursuit of its constitutionally mandated expanded mission.

Training
Training is the major task handled by 7RCDG, ARESCOM. Its primary arms are the university/college-based Department of Military Science and Tactics-administered mandatory basic and the optional advanced Reserve Officer Training Corps (ROTC); and the territorial unit-administered Basic Citizen's Military Training (BCMT).

Basic ROTC and BCMT graduates are enlisted as Privates in the Reserve Force, while advanced ROTC graduates are enlisted as Sergeants. Completion of Advance ROTC is considered a graduate qualification in Military Science, and such graduates who subsequently progress to the Probationary Officer Training Course (POTC) are commissioned as 2nd Lieutenants.

Other than time-in-grade and merit promotions, rank adjustments are authorized depending on civilian qualifications, as well as their reciprocity to the operating environment.

Types of reservists
There are currently two types of reservists in the Armed Forces of the Philippines (AFP) Reserve Force:
 Ready Reservists: physically-fit and tactically-current reservist personnel that are always on constant alert and training; ready to mobilise once a mobilisation order has been given.
 Standby Reservists: reservist personnel who do not maintain currency in specialization qualifications but the base for expansion, support and augmentation to the Ready Reserve Force as needed.

Units
The 7RCDG has several line units under its command, making the administration and training of reservists more compartmentalized and territorial based.

Base Units
 Headquarters & Headquarters Service Company
 ROTC Training Unit
 Citizens Military Training Unit
 Reservist Management Information Systems Office

Line Units
 701st (CEBU) Community Defense Center - Camp Rajah Lapu-lapu, Cebu City, Cebu
 702nd (BOHOL) Community Defense Center - Camp Bemnido, Dao District, Tagbilaran City, Bohol
 703rd (NEGROS ORIENTAL) Community Defense Center - Camp Leon Kilat, Tanjay, Negros Oriental
 704th (SIQUIJOR) Community Defense Center - Camp Kampilan, Siquijor, Siquijor

Reserve Divisions
 19th Infantry Division (Ready Reserve)

Reserve Battalions
 1st Cebu Infantry Battalion (Ready Reserve) - Sudlon, Lahug, Cebu
 1st Bohol Infantry Battalion (Ready Reserve) - Camp Gov Bernido, Dao District, Tagbilaran City, Bohol
 1st Negros Oriental Infantry Battalion (Ready Reserve) - Silliman University Cpd, Dumaguete

Awards and decorations

Campaign streamers

Badges

References
Citations

Bibliography

 Official Site ARESCOM
 Military Science 21 ROTC Manual, 2001, NCR RCDG, ARESCOM

See also
 Philippine Army Reserve Command

Military units and formations of the Philippine Army
Reserve and Auxiliary Units of the Philippine Military